Belaya Kholunitsa is a river in Kirov Oblast in Russia, a left tributary of the Vyatka.

The Belaya Kholunitsa has its sources in the Upper Kama Heights, and flows through a flat landscape. The river is frozen over from November to April. It is used for floating of timber.

The town of Belaya Kholunitsa is situated by the river.

References

Rivers of Kirov Oblast